Phobos (Greek for "fear") most commonly refers to:
 Phobos (moon), a moon of Mars
 Phobos (mythology), the Greek god and personification of fear and panic
Phobos may also refer to:

Comics
 Phobos (Marvel Comics)
 Phobos (W.I.T.C.H.), a character from W.I.T.C.H.

Computer programming
 Project Phobos, a Java-based web application environment
 A runtime and standard library of D programming language

Other uses
 Phobos (album), a 1997 album by Voivod
 Phobos (audio drama), a 2007 audio drama based on Doctor Who
 Phobos (launch platform), a floating launch platform being refit by SpaceX
 PHOBOS experiment, a nuclear physics experiment
 Phobos program, a Soviet space program of the late 1980s
 USS Phobos (AK-129), a World War II U.S. Navy Crater-class cargo ship
 Huitzil or Phobos, a character in the Darkstalkers game series

See also
 Phobos Grunt, a Russian mission to Mars and its moon Phobos
 Phoebus (disambiguation)